is a seinen manga series by Spica Aoki. The plot centers around a student named Kuroe Akaishi who suffers from a mysterious illness, and how it may impact her newfound love interest. Kaiju Girl Caramelise appeared as a serial in the monthly manga magazine Monthly Comic Alive starting in early 2018. Kadokawa Shoten has published the chapters in six bound volumes. American publishing company Yen Press licensed the series for an English-language translation in North America. Five of these volumes have been released so far. The English-language translated series has received positive reception from critics who called it "enjoyable".

Plot
Kuroe Akaishi is described as "Psycho-tan" by her classmates and is an outcast at school. She suffers from a rare, incurable illness that causes deformations in her body at random times. She is surprised one day to find that Arata Minami, a popular guy in her class, starts to pay attention to her and questions the weird new feelings she has around him. It isn't long before her mother confesses to Kuroe that she is in fact a kaiju, which confirmed a realistic "dream" the prior night that involved her monster form rampaging through Tokyo. Kuroe struggles and is dismissive of the information, and worries that Arata will not accept her for what she is (both human and monster form).

Characters

The protagonist of the story, Kuroe has been suffering from a mysterious illness for at least sixteen years that causes abnormal body growth and disfigurement. This has led Kuroe to become an outcast feeling that nobody could accept someone like her. While Kuroe does not remember her past she tries her best to live a normal life in the present. She is surprised when Arata decides to date her and tries to hide her transformations from him whenever she can. Kuroe also has a pet dog named "Jumbo King".

Arata is a popular guy in Kuroe's school who starts getting model offerings. He takes interest in Kuroe, revealing that he too wants to be out of the spotlight, and lost a lot of weight to become the person he is known as. This quickly irritates the other jealous school girls crushing on him who cannot understand what he sees in Kuroe. Arata does not know that she is secretly a Kaiju which causes misunderstandings to happen. 

Kuroe's devoted mother, Rinko is shown to be there for her daughter against judgmental people knowing full well that she is a Kaiju. Rinko is also a former biologist who discovered the remains of an Kaiju and brought one of its eggs home with her. She then proceeded to raise the shape shifting baby Kaiju whom she named Koroe as a human. Rinko is a big fan of the singer Mayumi Hamasaki, who is based on Ayumi Hamasaki.

Koutarou is Rinko's former colleague when they were traveling biologists. He was with Rinko when they found a Kaiju skeleton and watched as Rinko decided to take home an egg vowing him to secrecy. While he does not approve of how Rinko raised Kuroe he acts like a protective uncle to her which causes Arata at one point to mistake him for a boyfriend. Koutarou has since started working for the Japanese government which has alarmed Rinko who just wants Kuroe and her newly hatched sibling to be happy.

Manatsu is depicted as a wealthy girl who has a romantic obsession for the Kaiju. She attends the same school as Kuroe where the two become best friends, while not knowing that her object of desire is in fact Kuroe. Manatsu has a habit of dressing up as a butterfly in order to get the Kaiji to "stomp her flat" whenever it shows up.

The most "popular" girl in Kuroe's school, Rairi is shown to be heavily into makeup. She becomes friends with Kuroe and the two form a trusting bond when she helps her gain confidence in herself. Kuroe later learns that Rairi has also been keeping a secret about the way she really looks.

Publication
Kaiju Girl Caramelise was first serialized in the monthly seinen magazine Monthly Comic Alive in February 2018, and later compiled into volumes. Spica Aoki had previous works serialized in magazines aimed towards girls (shōjo), so she was worried when a male-targeted (seinen) magazine picked up her series. Aoki thought she would have to make the series aimed more towards guys until her editors advised her that "this story really works best as shōjo" even though it was in a seinen magazine. The first volume was published by Kadokawa Shoten on June 23, 2018, six bound volumes have so far been published by the company. 

Kaiju Girl Caramelise was also released in ebook format on Kadokawa Shoten's "Comic Walker" website. On November 18, 2018, North American publisher Yen Press announced at Anime NYC that they had licensed the series. The first English Language volume was released on June 25, 2019, with announced future dates for the other volumes.

Reception
The English-language adaptation of Kaiju Girl Caramelise has received positive ratings: Rebecca Silverman from Anime News Network gave the first volume an overall "B+" rating, saying that the story works on "both metaphoric and literal levels". While Silverman also praised the "fun" art, she was critical of a few confusing pages and two of the characters. She called the volume overall an "enjoyable blend of adolescent metaphor". Sean Gaffney from "A Case Suitable for Treatment" called the first volume a "lot of fun", saying that the main character is intelligent and likeable. Gaffney goes on to say that he hoped the series would not go towards a "yuri" direction based on one of the character's actions, and that the series as a whole was fairly lighthearted, and "sweet in its own way". Brigid Alverson included the manga in a "Best of June 2019" grouping saying that the story is about a teen romance that "runs far, far off the rails". The first and second volume of Kaiju Girl Caramelise also made the 2020, and 2021 American Library Association's list of "Great Graphic Novels for Teens".

Notes

References

External links

 Official website at Monthly Comic Alive 
 Official ebook website at Comic Walker 
 

2018 manga
Romantic comedy anime and manga
Science fiction anime and manga
Seinen manga
Kadokawa Shoten manga
Yen Press titles
Kaiju